A Walk in the Woods may refer to:

 A Walk in the Woods (book), a 1998 book by Bill Bryson
 A Walk in the Woods (film, 2015), a 2015 film by Ken Kwapis, based on Bryson's book
 A Walk in the Woods (play), a 1988 play by Lee Blessing